Fred Schmind (or Schwind; May 11, 1881 – September 1, 1960) was an American gymnast and athlete who took part in the 1904 Summer Olympics. He represented the club Chicago Central Turnverein.

Schmind took part in the following events in the 1904 Olympics:
 37th in the gymnastics triathlon
 22nd place in gymnastics
 15th place in 100 metres
 4th place in long jump
 20th place in the shot put
 7th place in the athletics triathlon

References

External links
 
 

1881 births
1960 deaths
American gymnasts
Olympic gymnasts of the United States
Athletes (track and field) at the 1904 Summer Olympics
Gymnasts at the 1904 Summer Olympics